Krishna Ballabh Sahay (31 December 1898 – 3 June 1974) ,fondly known as K B Sahay was an Indian freedom fighter, who after Indian Independence became the Revenue Minister of Bihar and then became the fourth  Chief Minister of unified Bihar.

Early life 

Krishna Ballabh Sahay popularly known as K.B.Sahay was born in an Ambashtha Kayastha  Sanatan family on 31st December 1898 at Sheikhpura in Patna district of Bihar. He was the eldest son of Munshi Ganga Prasad, who served as a Darogha under British Rule British Raj at Padma Hazaribagh. In 1919, he graduated with first class in B.A. Hons. English from St. Columba's College, Hazaribagh then affiliated to Calcutta University.

Awards 
He was awarded the Sir Edward Albert Gait Gait's Gold Medal from the then Governor of Bihar & Orissa Mr. Gait for his excellence in English Language for his coherence & cohesion. His works are kept in Bihar Assembly. Indian National Congress Pays their tributes to K B SAHAY every year on his Birth Anniversary.

Independence movement 

Soon thereafter in 1920, Sri Krishna Ballabh Sahay jumped into the fray giving up further studies by joining the Civil Disobedience Movement at the call of Mahatma Gandhi. Between 1930 and 1934, he was jailed four times for different periods while taking part in the independence movement. During one of these incarcerations, he met his mentor Sri Babu and this bond of friendship remained intact throughout their lives. He was also close to Anugrah Narayan Sinha, the other legendary nationalist from Bihar.

Came 1942 and with it came Gandhi's battle cry of "Do or Die" for the "Quit India Movement". Before this, senior leaders of Bihar including Dr. Rajendra Prasad & Dr. Anugrah Narayan Sinha visited Bihar to convey the conclusions of the "Vardha Accord" as well as to charter an action plan for Bihar during the Quit India Movement, in an important meeting at Sadaquat Ashram. Sri Krishna Ballabh Sahay was a notable contributor to this plan. "Quit India Movement" was launched with great fierceness all over India and K B Sahay led the movement at Hazaribagh. The British Government ordered immediate arrest of all its leaders. An order to arrest K B Sahay was passed by Deputy Commissioner, Hazaribagh (Order No.: 132 of 10.08.1942) and the very next day he was sent off to jail. In jail, he was instrumental in the escape of Jayaprakash Narayan from jail along with his associates namely Rama Nandan Mishra, Yogendra Shukla, Suraj Narayan Singh, Sri Gulab Chand Gupta and Sri Shaligram Singh on 9 November 1942. As a consequence, he was sent off to Bhagalpur jail with orders for rigorous imprisonment.

Political life 

Earlier, when provincial autonomy was granted by the British Raj, Shri K B Sahay was elected to the Bihar Legislative Assembly in 1936 and was made a parliamentary secretary in Sri Krishna Sinha's ministry in 1937.

During this period, K. B. Sahay also developed sympathy for the poor peasants whose inhuman suffering at the hands of zamindars had a great bearing on his mind. At a meeting at Chhapra on 11 May 1942, presided over by Dr. Rajendra Prasad and at another such meeting at Kudra in Shahabad, he spoke at length on the subject. Chief Minister of Bihar Sri Babu and Deputy Chief Minister of Bihar Anugrah Babu, also came from zamindar families. Sri Babu asked him to arrange a public meeting at his native place Tarapur in Munger. At this meeting, issues related to "Torture of inhabitants of Banaili Raj by their Zamindar" was taken up by Sri Babu and Krishna Ballabh Babu. This meeting which was also attended by Acharya J. B. Kriplani and was a grand success. Krishna Ballabh Sahay single handedly reversed the Permanent Settlement Act of 1793 enacted by  Marquess of Cornwallis.

After independence, when the interim government was formed in Bihar, K.B. Sahay was given the Revenue ministry since it was his pet subject. This gave him an opportunity to fulfill his cherished dream of relieving the peasants from the clutches of zamindars. K. B. Sahay was assisted suitably by Sri Bajrang Sahay in drafting "Abolition of Zamindari" Bill and the credit for its successful implementation goes to Sri Krishna Babu who faced the brunt of the zamindars in the Bihar Assembly and got it passed successfully.

He is credited with having authored and passed the first pioneering legislation in the country to abolish the Zamindari system. In 1952, it was the first such legislation in the country. With the Bill becoming an Act (Bihar Act 30 of 1950), it sent shock waves among the zamindars all over Bihar and these zamindars under the leadership of Dr. Kameshwar Singh of Darbhanga decided to challenge the Act as a violation of Article 14 of the Constitution of India. During this period, Sri K. B. Sahay also survived a body blow intended to wipe him out. K.B. Sahay was almost alone in his crusade for land reforms in the formative 1950s and '60s. Bihar was the first to introduce legislation to abolish zamindari. But Patna High Court struck down the Act, as did the Supreme Court. It was this that led an exasperated Jawaharlal Nehru to push the first amendment to the Constitution. The Constitution of India was amended for the first time and Article 31 (A) and Article 31 (B) were added to nullify the effect of Article 14. The legislation on land ceilings was introduced in the Assembly in 1955. A watered-down version was passed only in 1959 and got presidential assent in 1962.

K. B. Sahay contested the first assembly elections of 1952 from Giridih and won by a handsome margin to return as the revenue minister to the Government of Bihar in Sri Babu's cabinet. But in 1957, he was defeated in the assembly election from Giridih by Raja Kamakhya Narayan Singh of Padma (Hazaribag). However, K. B. Sahay won the assembly elections of 1962 to enter the Bihar Assembly for the third time. In 1957, during the leadership struggle between Dr. S K Sinha and Dr. Anugrah Narayan Sinha, he supported Anugrah Babu for becoming Chief Minister. However Sri Krishna Babu won and again became the CM with Anugrah Babu as his deputy.

Chief Minister of Bihar 

In the years that followed, Kamraj, the veteran Congress leader came forward with his "Kamraj Plan" to strengthen the party. On 19 September 1963, with the announcement of "Kamraj Plan" came the news of Binodanand Jha being taken as one of the eight Chief Ministers to look after the affairs of Congress Party. Beer Chand Patel threw his hat in the contest for the Chief Minister of Bihar. Sahay who was deputy minister in Jha's cabinet was the other contestant. Satyendra Narayan Sinha, the prominent Education Minister, who was decidedly second-in-command in the Binodanand Jha Cabinet announced his support for Sahay. Patel was no match for Sahay, who polled double the number of votes as Patel.

On 2 October 1963, the birth anniversary of Gandhi was celebrated in Bihar along with the swearing in ceremony of Sahay as the fourth Chief Minister of Bihar with Satyendra Narayan Sinha again becoming second in command.

Sahay lost the 1967 elections but won the local body elections in 1974 to enter the Bihar Legislative Council as an MLC. He faced enquiries by the Aiyyar Commission in between but was vindicated. Sahay met with a fatal road accident on 3 June 1974 just after winning the election, on his way back to his native place Hazaribag.

Among the leaders of Bihar belonging to the 20th century, whom the people of this state would long remember for the constructive and invaluable services rendered towards the progress of Bihar, Sahay would certainly find a prominent place. His life is a superb example of how a man can attain his cherished dream by dogged determination, systematic planning and hard labour. He dream of an independent India and an ever progressing Bihar for which he sacrificed his whole life.

Gallery

Assassination 
K B Sahay was assassinated  on 3 June 1974, in a deliberate mishap wherein a truck on Hazaribag - Patna Highway in Sindoor suddenly put its brakes and backedup while Mr. Sahay was on the front seat of his black Hindustan Ambassador registration number BRM 201 (being driven by Surendra) and dashed into his car causing him to die on the spot and was done by the criminalized sections of the Indira Gandhi Indian National Congress, his rival Party who were against his rise in the Bihar politics & had filed false cases against K B Sahay as he opposed & abolished the Zamindari system of Ramgarh Raj.

Family 

His statue inside a large triangular park can be witnessed by all commuters to Hazaribagh from the National Highway 33 built by his first Son, Chief Engineer of Bihar, Shri Neelkanth Prasad.His third son Shri Rameshwar Prasad popularly known as Ram Babu (Criminal Lawyer) was the only one from his family to be in the field of politics and became Member of Legislative Council while K B Sahay was alive and also post his death from Indian National Congress party. Currently his grandson Manoj Sahay from Tilaiya is associated with the party. His grandson Prashant Sahay popularly known as Dimlu (animal lover), a crusader, criminal lawyer, restaurant owner and Public Interest Litigation Activist ran for elections and exposed the Coal Mafia Nexus in the Coal Mine Belt of Jharkhand but was shot dead in September 2004 as he was about to expose the corrupt officers in Jharkhand against whom a crucial hearing was about to take place at Ranchi High Court when he denied any compromise.

Industries and Education
Shree Krishna Ballabh Sahay was responsible for setting up of several industries in the state, prominent among them are the Barauni Refinery, and the Bokaro Steel Plant. Both were commissioned during his tenure as Chief Minister of Bihar. The Heavy Engineering Corporation  Ranchi where the current Jharkhand Government runs, was commissioned during his tenure.

As the Chief Minister of Bihar, he gave full support for the establishment of Sainik School for Indian Armed Forces in Tilaiya. He was also instrumental in starting women's college in Hazaribag in 1963, which is named after him.

References

1974 deaths
1898 births
Chief Ministers of Bihar
Members of the Bihar Legislative Council
People from Patna district
Indian independence activists from Bihar
Chief ministers from Indian National Congress
Indian National Congress politicians from Bihar
Prisoners and detainees of British India
20th-century Indian politicians